Paul Korir is a Kenyan Anglican bishop: since 2016 he has been the inaugural Bishop of Kapsabet.

References

Living people
21st-century Anglican bishops of the Anglican Church of Kenya
Anglican bishops of Kapsabet
Year of birth missing (living people)